Ok So-ri (born 23 December 1968) is a South Korean actress. "Ok So-ri" is her stage name; her real name is Ok Bo-gyeong (옥보경). 
Ok made her debut in a TV commercial in 1987. She appeared in  the TV series Hero's Diary in 1994.

Adultery case

In 2008, she was accused of adultery   with an opera singer, and an Italian chef working at a Seoul luxury hotel. Her husband, Park Chul (박철), a radio talk show personality, sought the maximum sentence of two years' imprisonment, while the prosecutors were seeking 18 months. Ok blamed her infidelity on a loveless marriage. She was sentenced, in December 2008, to eight months in prison by a suburban Seoul court, but avoided jail because the sentence was suspended for two years.
In September 2008, a lower court had declared both partners jointly responsible for their divorce, and awarded custody of their eight-year-old daughter to Mr. Park.

Ok had been trying to overturn a 1953 law that criminalises extramarital affairs and can send a person to jail for up to two years for adultery. For this purpose she brought a case before the Constitutional Court of Korea, which ruled against the actress and in handing the decision said that society would be harmed if it overturned the law,
and that the "two-year jail term is not excessive when comparing it to responsibility." 
In 2015, South Korea's Constitutional Court overturned the law that made adultery a crime, which had been on the books since 1953.

Personal life
Ok married an Italian in 2011, and gave birth to a son and a daughter. The family lived  in Taiwan, but Ok later divorced her second husband. Following their 2014 divorce, her Italian ex-husband received child custody rights and remarried in 2016.

Filmography
Kuro Arirang 구로아리랑 (1989)
Watercolor Painting in a Rainy Day 비 오는 날 수채화 (1989)
A Sketch of a Rainy Day 젊은 날의 초상 (1990)
A Pale Rainy Day 햐얀 비요일 (1991)
Watercolor Painting in a Rainy Day 2 비 오는 날 수채화 2 (1993)
Karuna 카루나 (1996)

References

External links

 
Business Partner Spills Beans on Celebrity Couple Divorce, Digital Chosunilbo, 25 October 2007
Star Couple's Divorce Turns Nasty, The Korea Times, 29 October 2007
Is hanky-panky a crime?, JoongAng Daily, 12 March 2008
Court challenge on adultery rocks South Koreans, Taipei Times, 21 May 2008
Soap and sex scandal could spell the end of Korea's adultery ban, The Independent, 24 May 2008
Yes, adultery is criminal, The Straits Times, 30 October 2008
South Korea seeks to jail actress for adultery, The Hollywood Reporter, 26 November 2008
South Korean prosecutors seek jail time for Ok So-Ri, actress who committed adultery, Daily News, 27 November 2008
Sex not Ok: actress escapes jail over affair, Sydney Morning Heralds, 17 December 2008
YouTube video

1968 births
Living people
South Korean actresses
Uiryeong Ok clan
Marriage in South Korea